Rogers Lake is located in Glacier National Park, in the U. S. state of Montana. Nearby mountains include Rogers Peak to the north.

See also
List of lakes in Flathead County, Montana (M-Z)

References

Lakes of Glacier National Park (U.S.)
Lakes of Flathead County, Montana